Dust to Ashes is the debut studio album by American metalcore band Bleeding Through. It was released on compact disc by Prime Directive Records on March 20, 2001. Prime Directive Records also planned to release the album on 12" vinyl but that edition was cancelled. 

In promotion of the album, Bleeding Through toured the United States several times between March and November 2001. The bands that accompanied Bleeding Through on these tours include Walls of Jericho, Eighteen Visions, Throwdown, Martyr A.D., Every Time I Die and From Autumn to Ashes. The band also performed at notable festivals like Hellfest in Syracuse, New York.

Dust to Ashes's recording session and following promotional tours featured a great deal of member changes for Bleeding Through. The album was recorded with vocalist Brandan Schieppati, bass guitarist Vijay Kumar, drummer Troy Born and guitarists Chad Tafolla and Scott Danough. During the recording session, the band recruited keyboardist Molly Street. Born left the band shortly after the recording was completed and was replaced by Derek Youngsma. Kumar quit in early 2001, but rejoined the band in time for the album's release show a month later. Following the band's first tour, Tafolla departed and was succeeded by Brian Lepke. Kumar was ultimately kicked out in early 2002, after completing all of the touring for Dust to Ashes and recording part of the band's follow-up album, Portrait of the Goddess.

Development and recording 
Following the recording of their five-song demo CD-R in February 2000, Bleeding Through was approached by two record labels. The first was Balboa, California-based record label Prime Directive Records, which had previously released material by Throwdown, a band whose members were then-shared with Bleeding Through. Prime Directive Records' owner, Chase Corum, offered to release Bleeding Through's next-recorded material as a 7" vinyl EP (as he had done with Throwdown in 1998).

The second company to approach Bleeding Through was Ojay, California-based record label The Association of Welterweights Records, which had released the Various Artists compilation As the Sun Sets - A Southern California Hardcore Compilation. The compilation featured Eighteen Visions, another band whose members were then-shared with Bleeding Through. The Association of Welterweights Records' owner, Graham Donath, offered to release Bleeding Through's next-recorded material as a full-length CD, but by this time, the band was already committed to Prime Directive Records.  After replacing bass guitarist Marc Jackson with Vijay Kumar, the band wound up with a full-length's worth of material, which Corum was eager to release fully through Prime Directive Records.

The band, which then included vocalist Brandan Schieppati, guitarists Chad Tafolla and Scott Danough, bass guitarist Vijay Kumar and drummer Troy Born, entered Doubletime Studios in San Diego, California to record ten songs with producer Jeff Forrest from September to October 2000. Forest had previously recorded material by the members' other bands, including Eighteen Visions' albums Yesterday Is Time Killed and Until the Ink Runs Out and Taken's demo tape, 7" single Haven / Crayons and album Finding Solace In Dissension. During the recording session, the band recruited keyboardist Molly Street. Street had been asked to contribute a few keyboard parts to select songs on the release, but after the material turn out so well, she wound up contributing keyboard parts to all of the songs and joining the band as a full member. 

The studio session included the re-recording of all five songs from the band's demo, in addition to five new songs. Show of Hands vocalist Steve Helferich provided guest vocals on the song "Oedipus Complex", while Nemirah vocalist Collin O'Brien provided guest vocals on the song "Just Another Pretty Face". Drummer Troy Born, credited as Tregan Bjorganheigan, contributed vocals to the unlisted song "Shadow Walker (Alternate Version)".

Release and promotion 

In December 2000, before Dust to Ashes was released, drummer Born departed in order to focus his energy into his other band Taken. Bleeding Through recruited former Daggers drummer Derek Youngsma. In late February 2001, bass guitarist Kumar hastily quit the band, only to resume his position in time for the album release show a month later.

Dust to Ashes was released on compact disc by Prime Directive Records on Tuesday, March 20, 2001. The band played two shows with Detroit, Michigan metalcore band Walls of Jericho the following weekend. The first on Saturday, March 24, 2001 at the Veterans' Memorial Hall in Santa Cruz, California; the second, the proper album-release show, on Sunday, March 25, 2001 at the Showcase Theater in Corona, California, supported by Eighteen Visions, Undying and The Kill. 

Prime Directive Records planned to release Dust to Ashes on 12" vinyl, limited to 300 copies, but this was delayed to due indecisiveness from the band. The record label ultimately ordered eight test pressings in June 2001, but the proper release was cancelled. Bleeding Through also planned to record new material and a Weezer cover songs for a 7" vinyl release on Prime Directive Records in the spring of 2001, but this later evolved into the writing of their sophomore album, Portrait of the Goddess.

Following months of negotiations, Bleeding Through signed a three-release (two albums and one EP) contract with Huntington Beach, California-based record label Indecision Records in early April 2001. The company's first plan was to co-release the forthcoming 7" vinyl and CD EP with Prime Directive Records in the fall of 2001, followed by the band's sophomore full-length album in early 2002.

In support of Dust to Ashes, Bleeding Through embarked on their first tour; a week's worth of shows with Throwdown on the West Coast. A second tour ensued, which spanned from June 20, 2001 to July 6, 2001, Accompanied by roadie Graham Donath (owner of The Association of Welterweights Records) and Schieppati's other band Eighteen Visions, which was promoting their third full-length album, The Best of Eighteen Visions, released on June 12, 2001 by Trustkill Records. The two bands played through California, Washington, Idaho, Utah, Colorado, Missouri, Nebraska, Montana, Iowa, Kentucky, Illinois and New York, including a performance at Hellfest 2001. 

In August 2001, a month after returning from tour, Tafolla left the band. Like the band's former drummer Born, Tafolla left to focus on his other band Taken. Bleeding Through then recruited guitarist Brian Lepke and mostly played local California shows during the rest of the summer and early autumn 2001. Footage of the band's summer shows was included on Indecision Records' VHS and DVD release Indecision Video Vault Volume One.

Bleeding Through embarked on a three-day weekend mini-tour of California, from October 19–21, 2001 with label-mates Throwdown, and accompanied by Martyr A.D. and Every Time I Die. This was followed a month later by a ten-day West Coast tour with From Autumn to Ashes, who were promoting their album Too Bad You're Beautiful released by Ferret Music. Immediately upon returning from their tour with From Autumn to Ashes in late November 2001, Bleeding Through entered F1 Studio to begin the recording of their sophomore album, Portrait of the Goddess. Four songs recorded for Dust to Ashes (including one that also appeared on their demo), "Turns Cold to the Touch", "Just Another Pretty Face", "Ill Part Two" and "I Dream of July", were re-recorded for Portrait of the Goddess. The song "Shadow Walker" was later re-recorded for the band's third album, This is Love, This is Murderous.

Track listing

Personnel 
Credits are adapted from the album's liner notes.
Bleeding Through
 Brandan Schieppati – vocals
 Scott Danough – guitar
 Chad Tafolla – guitar
 Vijay Kumar – bass guitar
 Molly Street – keyboards
 Troy Born – drums

Guest musicians
 Collin O'Brien – backing vocals on "Just Another Pretty Face"
 Steve Helferich – backing vocals on "Oedipus Complex"
 Troy Born (as Tregan Bjorganheigan) – backing vocals on "Shadow Walker (Alternate Version)"

Production
 Jeff Forrest – recording and mixing engineer at Doubletime Studios
 Molly Street – photography
 Jason Brown – promotional band photography
 Matt Gigliotti – live band photography
 Marc Jackson – logo design
 Chad Tafolla – layout and design

References 

2001 debut albums
Bleeding Through albums